Mioči (Cyrillic: Миочи) is a village in the municipality of Kakanj, Bosnia and Herzegovina.

Demographics 
According to the 2013 census, its population was 31.

References

Populated places in Kakanj